The Kankan region now has more than 6,167,904 inhabitants (2021) the most popular region of Guinea The region has five (5) prefectures (Kankan, Kérouané, Kouroussa, Mandiana and Siguiri), 53 sub-prefectures, 5  urban communes, 53 rural communes , 878 arrondissements, 68 neighborhoods and 1864 sectors.

Kankan Region is located in eastern Guinea. It is bordered by the countries of Mali and Côte d'Ivoire and the Guinean regions of Nzérékoré and Faranah.

Administrative divisions
Kankan Region is divided into five prefectures; which are further sub-divided into 57 sub-prefectures:

Geography
Kankan Region is traversed by the northwesterly line of equal latitude and longitude.

Major towns include: Bohodou.

References

 

Regions of Guinea